De triumphis ecclesiae is a Latin epic in elegiac metre, written c. 1250 by Johannes de Garlandia, an English grammarian who taught at the universities of Toulouse and Paris. A desultory work, it mentions episodes of the Crusades (including the Albigensian Crusade) alongside events in Johannes' own life, illustrating the details of his affair with a young man from his University, with sketches of some acquaintances including John of London, his teacher at Oxford; bishop Foulques of Toulouse; Alan of Lille, a contemporary at Paris; and Roland of Cremona, a contemporary at Toulouse.

External links
Full list of contents in the Latin Vicipaedia

Bibliography
Johannis de Garlandia De triumphis ecclesiae ed. Thomas Wright. London: Nichols, 1856. [Text]
Two Medieval Satires on the University of Paris: La Bataille des VII Ars of Henri d’Andeli and the Morale Scolarium of John of Garland ed. Louis John Paetow. Berkeley: University of California Press, 1927. [Life of Johannes de Garlandia]

13th-century Latin books
Epic poems in Latin
1250s works